Edward Joseph Britt (July 19, 1912 – November 21, 1978) was an American football running back in the National Football League for the Boston/Washington Redskins and the Brooklyn Dodgers.  He attended the College of the Holy Cross.

References

1912 births
1978 deaths
People from Lexington, Massachusetts
Sportspeople from Middlesex County, Massachusetts
Players of American football from Massachusetts
American football running backs
Boston Redskins players
Washington Redskins players
Brooklyn Dodgers (NFL) players